The 2019 Shetland by-election was held on 29 August 2019 to elect a Member of the Scottish Parliament (MSP) for the constituency of Shetland. It was held following the resignation of Liberal Democrat MSP Tavish Scott upon taking a new role at Scottish Rugby. The Liberal Democrats held the seat, with Beatrice Wishart being elected for the party.

Candidates
The Liberal Democrats' Beatrice Wishart was deputy convener of the Shetland Islands Council. The Scottish National Party fielded Shetland-born Tom Wills, an engineer with an offshore renewables company. Two Shetland Islands Council members, Ian Scott and Ryan Thomson, ran as independent candidates. A former Shetland Islands Council member, Michael Stout, also ran as an independent candidate.

The campaign was hard-fought; the SNP spent £100,000 on the by-election - more money than the party spent during the entire EU referendum - and there was a swing of over 14% to their candidate.

Result

Previous result

References

Shetland 2019
Shetland by-election
2010s elections in Scotland
Shetland by-election
Politics of Shetland
Shetland by-election